KRNE may refer to:

 KRNE-FM, a radio station (91.5 FM) licensed to Merriman, Nebraska, United States
 KRNE-TV, a television station (channel 12 analog/17 digital) licensed to Merriman, Nebraska, United States